Aizkraukle is a town in Vidzeme region in Latvia, the administrative centre of Aizkraukle Municipality on the right bank of the Daugava River. The population in 2020 was 7,018.

History
In the second half of the 14th century Livonian Order built the Aizkraukle Castle, a few kilometres downstream from the ancient hillfort of Livs. The ruins of the castle still remain today. Before World War I, the settlement that stood near the site of modern-day Aizkraukle was known by its German name of Ascheraden.

The modern town was established in 1961 as a settlement to house the builders of the nearby hydroelectric power plant of Pļaviņas. It was originally called Stučka (or "", Stuchka and "", imeni Petra Stuchki in Russian), for Pēteris Stučka, a Latvian communist. Town status was granted to it in 1967, which is also when it became the administrative center of Stučkas District. In 1990, it was renamed Aizkraukle, after the nearest railway station. The name literally means beyond the Kraukle River.

Economy
General industries in the area include power generation, woodworking, printing, and agriculture.

In 2004 Aizkraukle was awarded "The tidiest town in Latvia 2004" in its size group.

See also 
 Aizkraukle Station

Citations and references

Cited sources
Е. М. Поспелов (Ye. M. Pospelov). "Имена городов: вчера и сегодня (1917–1992). Топонимический словарь." City Names: Yesterday and Today (1917–1992). Toponymic Dictionary." Москва, "Русские словари", 1993.
Latvijas PSR Augstakās Padomes Prezidija Padomju Darba Jautājumu Daļa. Latvijas PSR Administratīvi Teritoriālais Iedalījums. 1978. gads. Izdevnieciba "Liesma", Riga 1978.

 
Towns in Latvia
Cities and towns built in the Soviet Union
Populated places established in 1967
Kreis Riga
1967 establishments in the Soviet Union
Aizkraukle Municipality